Tanto may refer to:

Places
 , district of Stockholm, Sweden
 Tantō, Hyōgo, Japan

Music
Tanto (album), 2012 album by Pablo Alborán
"Tanto" (song), title track
"Tanto", a 1990 song by Lucero
"Tanto", a 2019 song by Jesse & Joy featuring Luis Fonsi

Others
 Tantō, a (usually) short, thin Japanese sword
 Daihatsu Tanto, a concept car based on the Daihatsu Move kei car
 Kris Paronto (born 1971), known as Tanto

See also
 
 Tonto, a character in the Lone Ranger universe